The Cyprus Investment Promotion Agency (CIPA) is the national investment promotion agency of Cyprus with the mandate to enhance the nation's investment appeal abroad.

Scope
In 2017, the real estate, shipping and tourism industries are the priority sectors in CIPA's action plan for investment promotion, but there is increasing focus on developing a nascent energy sector.

References

External links

International trade organizations
Economy of Cyprus
Investment promotion agencies